Cephetola maesseni, the Maessen's greasy epitola, is a butterfly in the family Lycaenidae. It is found in Ivory Coast and Ghana (the Volta Region).

References

Butterflies described in 1999
Poritiinae